The Falconar F12A Cruiser is a Canadian amateur-built aircraft, designed by Chris Falconar and originally produced as a kit by Falconar Avia. The aircraft is now supplied as plans for amateur construction by Manna Aviation.

Design and development
The F12A is a development of the Falconar F11 Sporty, which is, in turn, a variant of the Jodel D11. Falconar indicates that it incorporates a larger cockpit, simplified fittings, shoulder harnesses and aerodynamic improvements to improve stall characteristics over the Jodel design.

Hans Teijgeler of Jodel.com says that the F12A varies from the D11 by using a new wing design, with new simplified spar and rib design and the dihedral point moved inboard, allowing the outer portion to fold for ground transport or storage, but at the cost of added weight, plus the option of a third seat. Teijgeler describes the wing as "less efficient". Teijgeler also notes that the F12 uses much larger and heavier engines with higher fuel consumption. Teijgeler says of the Falconar F12, "the Falconar 'Jodel' should not be looked upon as a Jodel, but as a Falconar. This is [n]either good or bad. Just a fact to take into account"

The aircraft is made from wood, with its flying surfaces covered in doped aircraft fabric. Construction time from the supplied kit is 1200 hours.

Operational history
By November 2012, six examples were registered in its home country with Transport Canada, one in the United States with the Federal Aviation Administration and two with the CAA in the United Kingdom.

Specifications (F12A)

References

External links
Official website
Photo of a Falconar F12A Cruiser

Homebuilt aircraft
F12A Cruiser
Single-engined tractor aircraft